Nesci is an Italian surname. Notable people with the surname include:

Filippo Nesci (born 1993), Italian multimedia artist and producer
Joe Nesci (born 1956), American basketball coach
Jonathan Nesci (born 1981), American designer

Italian-language surnames